Sulcerato is a genus of small sea snails, marine gastropod mollusks in the family Eratoidae, the false cowries or trivias and allies.

Species
 Sulcerato haplochila (Melvill & Standen, 1903)
 † Sulcerato illota (Tate, 1890) 
 Sulcerato pagoboi (T. Cossignani & V. Cossignani, 1997)
 Sulcerato pellucida (Reeve, 1865)
 Sulcerato rapa Fehse, 2020
 Sulcerato recondita (Melvill & Standen, 1903)
 Sulcerato tomlini (Schilder, 1933)
Synonyms
 Sulcerato galapagensis (F. Schilder, 1933): synonym of Archierato galapagensis (Schilder, 1933)
 Sulcerato sandwichensis (G. B. Sowerby II, 1859): synonym of Eratoena sandwichensis (G. B. Sowerby II, 1859)
 Sulcerato stalagmia (C. N. Cate, 1975): synonym of Cypraeerato stalagmia (C. N. Cate, 1975)
Taxon inquirednum
 Sulcerato rehderi (Raines, 2002)

References

External links
 Finlay H.J. (1930). Invalid molluscan names. No. 1. Transactions of the New Zealand Institute. 61: 37-48

Eratoidae